Russell George may refer to:
 Russell George (Welsh politician)
 Russell George (American politician)
 J. Russell George, American attorney